Francis Newport (fl. 1559) was an English politician.

He was a Member (MP) of the Parliament of England for Droitwich in 1559.

References

Year of birth missing
Year of death missing
Members of the Parliament of England for Droitwich
English MPs 1559